A Madea Family Funeral is a 2019 American comedy film written, directed, and produced by Tyler Perry. It is the eleventh installment of the Madea cinematic universe, and stars Perry in several roles, including as the titular character, as well as Cassi Davis and Patrice Lovely. The plot follows Madea and her friends as they must set up an unexpected funeral during a family get-together in Maxine, Georgia.

The film was released in the United States on March 1, 2019. The film received generally negative reviews from critics but grossed over $75 million worldwide. This is the last film from Tyler Perry to be released by Lionsgate, with Paramount Pictures and Netflix taking over distribution of future Perry films via his deal with ViacomCBS. Though A Madea Family Funeral was originally intended to be the final film in the series, a sequel titled A Madea Homecoming was released in 2022.

Plot
In Maxine, Georgia, A.J. (Courtney Burrell), Jesse (Rome Flynn), and Sylvia (Ciera Payton) are planning a surprise party to celebrate the 40th wedding anniversary of their parents Vianne (Jen Harper) and Anthony (Derek Morgan) with the assistance of A.J.'s wife, Carol (KJ Smith). Madea (Tyler Perry), Joe (Tyler Perry), Brian (Tyler Perry), Aunt Bam (Cassi Davis), and Hattie (Patrice Lovely) travel to the backwoods of Georgia for the anniversary party. Also in attendance for the anniversary party is Madea and Joe's brother Heathrow (Tyler Perry). On the way, they deal with a manic, rude police officer (Joel Rush) which they are surprised when he acts nice all of a sudden.

At last, they get to their hotel—and catch Anthony in a sex act with Renee (Quin Walters), Vianne's best friend, while A.J. is in the next room with Jesse's fiancée Gia (Aeriél Miranda). Anthony suffers a heart attack from sex with Renee, and Brian tries to resuscitate him, after which he is rushed to the hospital. Anthony's family is informed of the incident and meets up with Brian's group. As Vianne praises Brian for trying his best to resuscitate Anthony, a doctor (Selena Anduze) informs the entire group that Anthony is dead.
 
A.J. and Madea's group keep the exact cause of death a secret from the rest of the family. Renee and A.J. blackmail each other to keep their secrets hidden and A.J. blames Renee for his father's affair and death. But Renee responds saying "I'm not the one [to be played with]."
 
Vianne asks Madea to plan Anthony's funeral and says she wants to have it in two days, which makes everyone suspicious. The undertaker (Aryeh-Or) at the funeral gives Madea, Bam, and Hattie a creepy vibe as he informs them that Anthony died smiling and that the casket can't close because of Anthony's erection. At the funeral, presided over by Madea, non-family members are made to sit on one side of the room, but the area is filled with numerous mistresses from Anthony's, visibly upsetting Vianne. The service lasts for hours until the casket abruptly opens (for the aforementioned reason) causing everyone to leave in a panic.
 
At the repast, a drunk A.J. reveals Anthony and Renee's affair. Renee then exposes A.J.'s affair with Gia as she gets kicked out of the house. This makes a heartbroken Carol to decide to leave him. A.J. and Jesse fight and Vianne tearfully reveals that she knows that Anthony has been unfaithful for years. Despite this, she only stayed with him to protect her family, and is choosing to live for herself from now on. When A.J. scolds her for being weak, she retaliates by saying he's just a boy and spiteful to others, forcing him to own up to what his actions and what they did to those around.

In the morning, Madea gets A.J. to apologize and try reconciling with Carol. Despite forgiving A.J., Carol refuses to stay with him claiming she wants to live freely. Vianne happily wishes the family luck as she leaves for Las Vegas with Roy (Mike Tyson), revealing that she was also having an affair while noting that Roy should've been their father. Madea, Bam, Hattie, and Carol then take their leave, so that A.J., Sylvia, and Jesse can sort out their issues.

Cast
 Tyler Perry as:
 Mabel "Madea" Simmons, an elderly tough lady
 Joe Simmons, Madea's brother
 Brian Simmons, the son of Joe and nephew of Madea and Heathrow who works as a lawyer
 Heathrow Simmons, the paraplegic brother of Madea and Joe, uncle of Brian, and father of Vianne. While Heathrow claims to be a war hero who is in a wheelchair upon losing his legs and speaks with a voice box because of a smoking problem, Madea claims that Heathrow lost his legs upon hitting on a mobster's girlfriend while Joe claims that Heathrow is diabetic.
 Cassi Davis as Aunt Bam, Madea's cousin
 Patrice Lovely as Hattie, a friend of Madea and Bam
 Jen Harper as Vianne, Anthony's wife, Heathrow's daughter, and Madea and Joe's niece
 Derek Morgan as Anthony, Vianne's husband who has an untimely death
 Courtney Burrell as A.J., Anthony and Vianne's oldest son
 Ciera Payton as Sylvia, Anthony and Vianne's daughter
 Rome Flynn as Jesse, Anthony and Vianne's youngest son
 KJ Smith as Carol, A.J.'s wife
 Aeriél Miranda as Gia, Jesse's fiancée
 David Otunga as Will, Silvia's husband
 Quin Walters as Renee, Anthony and Vianne's friend who was also one of Anthony's mistresses
 Christianee G. Porter as Soloist
 Joel Rush as Officer Willis, a police officer in Maxine, Georgia who pulls Brian over. Rush reprises his character from If Loving You Is Wrong.
 Mike Tyson as Roy, a man who Vianne was secretly having an affair with Jesse's wife
 Selena Anduze as Doctor
 Ary Katz as Undertaker
 Darryl Handy as Reverend
 Branden Miller as Joanne the Scammer, a drag queen and con artist who Madea knows
 Tiffany Black as Anthony's Mistress

Production
Filming took place at Tyler Perry Studios in Atlanta for one week in March 2017 before filming Boo 2! A Madea Halloween, given that this film was released two years after that film. In this movie Tyler Perry plays a new character named Heathrow, Madea and Joe's brother, a Vietnam War veteran.

Release
The film was released in theatres in the United States on March 1, 2019 by Lionsgate, after it was originally scheduled for release in the fall of 2018.

Lionsgate released a trailer for the film on October 31, 2018.

The film was released to Blu-ray and DVD on June 4, 2019 by Lionsgate.

Reception

Box office
A Madea Family Funeral has grossed $73.3 million in the United States and Canada, and $1.5 million in other territories, for a worldwide total of $74.8 million, against a production budget of $20 million.

In the United States and Canada, A Madea Family Funeral was released alongside Greta, and was projected to gross $18–20million from 2,442 theaters in its opening weekend. It made $1.1 million from Thursday night previews, a record for the Madea films, as well as one of the highest of Perry's career. It went on to debut to $27.1 million, finishing second at the box office behind holdover How to Train Your Dragon: The Hidden World and marking the third-best opening of the series. In its second weekend the film dropped 53% to $12.5 million, finishing third behind newcomer Captain Marvel and How to Train Your Dragon, and then made $8.1 million in its third weekend, finishing fifth.

Critical response
The website's critical consensus reads, "A lackluster conclusion to Tyler Perry's long-running franchise, A Madea Family Funeral proves saying goodbye can be painful for all the wrong reasons." On Metacritic, the film has a weighted average score of 39 out of 100, based on 11 critics, indicating "generally unfavorable reviews". Audiences polled by CinemaScore gave the film an average grade of "A−" on an A+ to F scale, while those at PostTrak gave it a 4 out of 5 stars and a 67% "definite recommend".

For The A.V. Club, Ignatiy Vishnevetsky rated the film D+, summing up the film franchise by writing, "The films are inane, sloppy, tone-deaf, moralizing, and have no sense of quality control, but there’s nothing quite like them."

Common Sense Media gave the film a 3 out of 5 star rating, saying "Madea says goodbye in winning but dirty slapstick comedy"; the website recommended it for ages 13+.

Accolades

* - Perry was nominated twice for Worst Supporting Actor, one each for his roles as Joe and Uncle Heathrow, respectively.

References

External links
 

2019 films
American comedy films
Films directed by Tyler Perry
Films shot in Atlanta
Films with screenplays by Tyler Perry
Lionsgate films
2010s American films
2010s English-language films